Su Jia-chyuan (or Su Chia-chyuan; ; born 22 October 1956) is a Taiwanese politician of the Democratic Progressive Party (DPP).

As the first non-Kuomintang President of the Legislative Yuan, Su is an at-large legislator and previously Commissioner of Pingtung County, and held national posts as Minister of the Interior and Minister of Agriculture under President Chen Shui-bian's administration. From May to August 2020, he briefly served as Secretary General to the President under the Tsai Ing-wen administration.

Education
After graduating from National Pingtung Senior High School, Su attended National Taiwan Ocean University.

2010 Taichung City Mayoralty election
In 2010 Su narrowly lost to Jason Hu in the election for Mayor of Taichung.

2012 Taiwan presidential election
Su was the vice-presidential candidate on the losing DPP ticket for the 2012 presidential election.

2016 elections
In 2016 legislative elections Su placed on the proportional representation ballot, and won a seat in the Legislative Yuan.

Su was elected the eleventh President of the Legislative Yuan on 1 February 2016, when the members of the ninth Legislative Yuan met for the first time. Su became the first DPP speaker in the Legislative Yuan.

Later political career
Su was named Secretary-General to the President on 20 May 2020. He resigned on 2 August 2020, following allegations of bribery against his nephew, legislator . In May 2022, Su succeeded Chiou I-jen as head of the Taiwan–Japan Relations Association.

Controversy
Su was impeached by the Control Yuan on 3 September 2012, for illegally constructing a luxury farmhouse on agricultural land without engaging in any agriculture. Su's villa, built on agricultural land, was a controversial issue in the 2012 presidential elections.

References

Living people
1956 births
National Sun Yat-sen University alumni
Magistrates of Pingtung County
Taiwanese Ministers of Agriculture
Taiwanese Ministers of the Interior
Members of the 2nd Legislative Yuan
Democratic Progressive Party Members of the Legislative Yuan
Members of the 9th Legislative Yuan
Taiwanese Presidents of the Legislative Yuan
Party List Members of the Legislative Yuan
Members of the 3rd Legislative Yuan
Pingtung County Members of the Legislative Yuan